Zallaq is a town on the western coast of Bahrain.
Zallaq was the home to the Al-Dawasir, Al-Zeabi and Al-Gahtam and Al-Seddiqi tribes in Bahrain together with Budaiya and Hawar Islands. It is famous for the Jazaer Beach (also known as Zallaq Beach). The Al Areen Wildlife Park is also near the Jazaer Beach in Zallaq. This area is also famous for its proximity to Bahrain International Circuit and Zallaq Springs, unique destination in bahrain offering dining experiences, lifestyle therapy and cultural events. The town has many fishing boats..

See also 
Bahrain

References

External links
Photos of Zallaq

yeyeyeye

Populated places in the Southern Governorate, Bahrain